Government Arts College, Thiruvannamalai, is a general degree college located in Thiruvannamalai, Tamil Nadu. It was established in 1966. It is affiliated with Thiruvalluvar University. This college offers different courses in arts, commerce and science.

Departments

Science
Physics
Chemistry
Mathematics
Botany
Zoology
Computer Science

Arts and Commerce
Tamil
English
History
Economics
Business Administration
Commerce

Accreditation
The college is  recognized by the University Grants Commission (UGC).

References

External links

Educational institutions established in 1966
1966 establishments in Madras State
Colleges affiliated to Thiruvalluvar University
Academic institutions formerly affiliated with the University of Madras